The South Dakota Legislative Research Council (colloquially known as the LRC) is the governmental agency under the legislative branch of the government of South Dakota.

South Dakota State Legislature
The Legislative Research Council operates in the South Dakota State Capitol in Pierre. It legislative duties are year-round, but its bill writing season begins the second Tuesday of January each year. The legislative session lasts 40 working days in odd-numbered years, and 35 days working days in even numbered years. Generally, the Legislative Research Council will work through every business day until the session ends, excepting on last day which is delayed to allow for consideration of gubernatorial vetoes. The LRC was founded by political science professor William O. Farber.

References

Schoenfeld, Fred (Legislative Research Council), (2012).  "South Dakota Legislator Reference Book"

South Dakota Legislature
Bicameral legislatures